Emily CoBabe-Ammann is an earth scientist who specializes in strategies for science and education initiatives. She is currently the director of strategic projects at the University of Colorado, at Boulder. In addition, she is a partner at the Climate Strategies Group.  Previously, she served as the director of the UCAR Community Programs at the University Corporation for Atmospheric Research (UCAR) in Boulder, Colorado.

Education
CoBabe-Ammann did her undergraduate work at the University of Wisconsin–Madison and went on to get her Ph.D. in earth and planetary sciences at Harvard University in 1991. She did postdoctoral work at the University of Bristol in England, the University of North Carolina, and Indiana University.

Career
After her postdoctoral positions, CoBabe-Ammann spent five years at the University of Massachusetts Amherst as a member of the faculty in the geosciences department. She then joined the science and math team at Mid-Continent Research on Education and Learning (McREL), then she began consulting work with science education centers, including the Science Education Center at the Medical Center of Wisconsin in Madison, Wisconsin. From 2003 to 2009, she was the head of communications and outreach at the University of Colorado Boulder Laboratory for Atmospheric and Space Physics where she helped build the third largest education and public outreach program, outside of NASA centers. From 2009 to 2013, she was the executive director of Emily A. CoBabe & Associates, Inc., a science and STEM education planning, management, and research company located in Boulder, Colorado. From 2013 to 2015, she was the director of  UCAR Community Programs at the University Corporation for Atmospheric Research (UCAR)., where she managed a $45M portfolio of education, training, data, and satellite programs.  She is a partner at the Climate Strategies Group, working on models for collective impact frameworks and participatory monitoring and evaluation for regional and national climate service efforts.

In October 2015, she took on the role of director of strategic projects at the University of Colorado in Boulder, where she leads the university's Grand Challenge: Our Space. Our Future., designed to translate earth and space science data and technologies into actionable knowledge.  Working with the new Earth Science data synthesis center (Earth Lab), and the new UAV and small satellite group (IRISS), Emily works to help the campus diversify its extramural funding profile, increase opportunities for the university to work with industry partners, and work strategically across the campus to effectively implement large scale STEM research and education initiatives.

References

External links
CU-Boulder Grand Challenge: Our Space. Our Future.
UCAR Community Programs
Mid-Continent Research on Education and Learning
Science Education Center at the Medical Center of Wisconsin

Living people
Alumni of the University of Bristol
Harvard Graduate School of Arts and Sciences alumni
University of Wisconsin–Madison alumni
University of Colorado Boulder faculty
University of Massachusetts Amherst faculty
University of North Carolina at Chapel Hill people
Year of birth missing (living people)